The Palace of los Ríos y Salcedo (Spanish: Palacio de los Ríos y Salcedo) is a palace located in Soria, Spain. It was declared Bien de Interés Cultural in 1982.

References 

Bien de Interés Cultural landmarks in the Province of Soria
Palaces in Castile and León